The 1935 Texas Tech Matadors football team represented Texas Technological College—now known as Texas Tech University—as a member of the Border Conference during the 1935 college football season. In their sixth season under head coach Pete Cawthon, the Matadors compiled a 5–3–2 record (0–1 against conference opponents) and outscored opponents by a combined total of 110 to 55. The team played its home games at Tech Field.

Schedule

References

Texas Tech
Texas Tech Red Raiders football seasons
Texas Tech Matadors football